The Cuprom Phoenix Copper Smelter is a smelter of sulfurous copper ores in Baia Mare, Romania.

Due to the toxic fumes causing acid rain, it has a  chimney,  built in 1995, making it the tallest artificial structure in Romania and the third tallest chimney in Europe. The chimney is no longer in use.

See also
 List of chimneys
 List of tallest chimneys in the world
 List of tallest structures in Europe

References

External links
Phoenix Copper Smelter Chimney
The Chimney Sweeps

Buildings and structures in Baia Mare
Chimneys in Romania
Metal companies of Romania
Industrial buildings completed in 1995
Companies of Maramureș County